Frog Creek is a stream in the U.S. state of West Virginia.

Frog Creek derives its name from a pioneer settler named Frogg.

See also
List of rivers of West Virginia

References

Rivers of Kanawha County, West Virginia
Rivers of West Virginia